Virulence is a peer-reviewed medical journal that covers microbiology and immunology specifically, microorganism pathogenicity, the infection process and host–pathogen interactions. It is a fully Open Access journal published by Taylor & Francis. It was previously published 8 times per year by Landes Bioscience. The journal was established in 2010 by Eva M. Riedmann, and Eleftherios Mylonakis. The editor-in-chief is Kevin Tyler (University of East Anglia).

Indexing and abstracting

The journal is abstracted and indexed in:

According to the Journal Citation Reports, the journal has a 2019 impact factor of 5.542.

References

External links

Microbiology journals
Taylor & Francis academic journals
Publications established in 2010
English-language journals
8 times per year journals